The American Association of Hispanics in Higher Education (AAHHE) represents professional academics, researchers, educators, and students in the United States of America and focuses on issues affecting Hispanics in higher education. It functions as a United States nonprofit 501(c)(3) membership society.

History 
AAHHE was originally the Hispanic caucus of the American Association of Higher Education (AAHE) and was formed in 2005 after that organization went defunct, to address the under representation of Hispanics in higher education. It does so by highlighting scholarship focusing on the social issues of Hispanics, the shaping of educational policies, and the professional development of Hispanic faculty and administrators. The organization holds an annual meeting and offers a fellowship program for graduate students and junior faculty.

Presidents 
Presidents of the society have included:

 Loui Olivas - Founding President and Director of the Center for Executive Development at Arizona State University

Tomás Rivera Lecture 
Past Tomás Rivera lecturers have included: Nobel Laureate Toni Morrison and U.S. Secretary Henry Cisneros, and former U.S. Ambassador to Argentina, Vilma Martinez.

Awards 
The association sponsors several awards including:

 University Faculty Award (formerly Outstanding Latino/a Faculty in Higher Education Award) (Research Institutions)
 Founding President's Award
 Book of the Year Award
 William Aguilar Cultural Arts Award
 Outstanding Support of Hispanic Issues Award
 Alfredo G. de los Santos Jr. Distinguished Leadership Award

Book of the Year Award 
Past winners include:

 2006: Jeanett Castellanos, Alberta M. Gloria and Mark Kamimura, The Latina/o Pathway to the Ph.D.: Abriendo Caminos
 2007: Sonia Nazario, Enrique's Journey
 2008: Mirta Ojito, Finding Mañana
 2009: Sandra Cisneros, House on Mango Street
 2010: Gustavo Arellano, Ask a Mexican!
 2011: David Montejano, Quizote's Soldiers: A Local History of the Chicano Movement, 1966-1981
 2012: Rubén Martinez, Crossing Over: A Mexican Family on the Migrant Trail
 2013: Arturo Madrid, In the Country of Empty Crosses: The Story of a Hispano Protestant Family in Catholic New Mexico
 2015: Alicia Gaspar de Alba, [Un]framing the "Bad Woman": Sor Juana, Malinche, Coyolxauhqui, and Other Rebels with a Cause
 2016: Dolores Inés Casillas, Sounds of Belonging: U.S. Spanish-Language Radio and Public Advocacy
 2017: Aída Hurtado, Mrinal Singa, Beyond Machismo
 2018: Alberto Acereda, Estela Benisimón, Alfredo G. de los Santos Jr., Gary Francisco Keller, Laura J. Rendón, Richard Tannenbaum, New Directions in Hispanic College Student Assessment and Academic Preparation Hispanic College Students Move Forward: Policies, Planning, and Progress in Promoting Access
 2019: Alberto Ledesma, Diary of a Reluctant Dreamer: Undocumented Vignettes from a Pre-American Life
2020: Gina Ann Garcia, Becoming Hispanic-Serving Institutions: Opportunities for Colleges and Universities

References

External links 
 Organization website

Professional associations based in the United States
501(c)(3) organizations
Hispanic and Latino American professional organizations
Non-profit organizations based in Arizona
Awards honoring Hispanic and Latino Americans